Samuel Wilson McGhee (2 May 1892 – 1948) was a Scottish footballer who played league football for Rochdale.

References

Rochdale A.F.C. players
Queen's Park F.C. players
Scottish footballers
People from Maybole
1892 births
1948 deaths
Association footballers not categorized by position